Dmitri Utkin (born July 10, 1984) is a Russian former professional ice hockey player. He was selected by Boston Bruins in the 7th round (228th overall) of the 2002 NHL Entry Draft.

Career statistics

External links

Living people
Boston Bruins draft picks
Lokomotiv Yaroslavl players
HC Spartak Moscow players
Traktor Chelyabinsk players
1984 births
Sportspeople from Yaroslavl
Russian ice hockey forwards